Princess Sophie Charlotte of Brandenburg-Bayreuth (Sophie Charlotte Albertine; 27 July 1713 – 2 March 1747), was a German noblewoman member of the House of Hohenzollern and by marriage Duchess of Saxe-Weimar and Saxe-Eisenach.

Born in Weferlingen, she was the fourth of five children born from the marriage of George Frederick Charles, Margrave of Brandenburg-Bayreuth and Princess Dorothea of Schleswig-Holstein-Sonderburg-Beck. In 1716 her mother was convicted of adultery and imprisoned; she probably never saw her again.

Life
In Bayreuth on 7 April 1734, Sophie Charlotte married Ernest Augustus I, Duke of Saxe-Weimar as his second wife. They had four children:
 Charles Augustus Eugen, Hereditary Prince of Saxe-Weimar (Weimar, 1 January 1735 – Weimar, 13 September 1736).
 Ernest Augustus II Konstantin, Duke of Saxe-Weimar-Eisenach (Weimar, 2 June 1737 – Weimar, 28 May 1758).
 Ernestine Auguste Sophie (Weimar, 4 January 1740 – Hildburghausen, 10 June 1786), married on 1 July 1758 to Ernst Frederick III Karl, Duke of Saxe-Hildburghausen.
 Ernest Adolph Felix (born and died Weimar, 23 January 1741 / b. Weimar, 1742 – d. Weimar, 1743) [?].

On 26 July 1741 she also became in the Duchess consort of Saxe-Eisenach after her husband inherited that land.

Sophie Charlotte died in Ilmenau aged 33. She was buried there.

References

|-
 

|-
 

House of Hohenzollern
1713 births
1747 deaths
Duchesses of Saxe-Eisenach
Daughters of monarchs